Gerhard Rex Lauck (born 1953) is an American neo-Nazi activist and publisher. Based in Lincoln, Nebraska, he is sometimes nicknamed the "Farm Belt Fuehrer" due to his rural origins.

Early life
Gary Lauck was born in Milwaukee, Wisconsin on May 12, 1953 to a German-American family. At age eleven, he moved to Lincoln, Nebraska with his family, his father becoming a professor of engineering at the University of Nebraska. Lauck skipped his senior year of high school and then attended the University of Nebraska for two years. By this point, he already held neo-Nazi beliefs.

Career as a Neo-Nazi 
In 1978, he shot and wounded his brother Jerry after a political dispute. Eventually, Lauck moved to Chicago, where he would spend most of his adult life. Lauck has lived in Fairbury, Nebraska since 2009; prior to that he lived in Lincoln, Nebraska. 

As leader of the NSDAP/AO he was in close contact with like-minded individuals and groups in Europe, notably Michael Kühnen with whom he worked closely from the 1970s. His contacts with the German neo-Nazi scene had begun in 1971 when as an 18-year-old Lauck had established the Auslandsorganisation (overseas organisation) of the National Socialist Combat Groups, a militant German neo-Nazi group that was quickly banned by the German government. Lauck's NSDAP/AO was established following this ban. A noted Germanophile, Lauck sported a toothbrush moustache and used the Nazi salute as his regular greeting. His speech impediment has been often confused with an affected German accent. Although based in the USA, Lauck spent much of his time as an activist in Europe, particularly during the early 1990s when the NSDAP/AO extended its network of contacts considerably. He produced large volumes of neo-Nazi literature in several languages and also dealt in computer discs detailing the building of bombs, both of which were distributed across a network of European contacts. In 1990 he ensured that the NSDAP/AO would link up with the Swedish neo-Nazi group Sveriges Nationella Forbund, which became instrumental in forming the "Nordic National Socialist Bloc" with like-minded activists in Norway. That same year he played a leading role in helping Kühnen, Gottfried Küssel and Christian Worch establish a network of Gesinnungsgemeinschaft der Neuen Front cells across the former East Germany following German reunification. Two years later the NSDAP/AO also concluded an agreement with the National Socialist Movement of Denmark, which up to that point had been a leading organisation within the rival World Union of National Socialists (WUNS). The change occurred after Povl Riis-Knudsen, a leading figure in WUNS, had been expelled from the Danish Nazi movement for marrying a Palestinian woman. During the early days of the Yugoslav Wars Lauck's journal New Order ran a series of articles in support of Croatia and they particularly expressed support for the Ustaše and the magazine was instrumental in recruiting neo-Nazi linked mercenaries to fight for the Croatian cause.

Lauck was arrested in Denmark in 1995, leading to a far right campaign in the USA against plans to extradite him to Germany, where he was wanted for distributing neo-Nazi propaganda. Nevertheless, Lauck was deported to Hamburg where he was tried and found guilty of distributing neo-Nazi pamphlets. He was sentenced to four years imprisonment. He was released on March 19, 1999 and deported back to the United States. Lauck runs Third Reich Books which continues to distribute Nazi paraphernalia online.

References

External links
 

1953 births
American neo-Nazis
American people imprisoned abroad
American people of German descent
Living people
People from Lincoln, Nebraska
Prisoners and detainees of Germany
Articles containing video clips